Stanley Grover Neinstendt (March 20, 1926 – August 24, 1997) was an American film, television, and theatre actor.

Life and career
Born in Woodstock, Illinois, Grover attended the University of Missouri, where earned his music degree. He made his theatre debut in 1951, appearing in the Broadway play, Seventeen, playing the "Singer with the Orchestra". His last theatre credit was in the Broadway play Don't Call Back in 1975. 

Later in his career, Grover began appearing in films and on television. His credits include: Ghostbusters, Barnaby Jones, Network, Being There, The Falcon and the Snowman, Sisters, Old Gringo, Hardcastle and McCormick, North Dallas Forty, Fandango, Hill Street Blues, Murder, She Wrote, The Patty Duke Show and The Onion Field. He also played the recurring role of a somber judge in the legal drama TV series L.A. Law.

Grover died in August 1997 of leukemia at the UCLA Medical Center in Los Angeles, California, at the age of 71. His body was cremated.

References

External links 

Rotten Tomatoes profile

1926 births
1997 deaths
People from Woodstock, Illinois
Male actors from Illinois
Deaths from leukemia
American male film actors
American male television actors
American male stage actors
20th-century American male actors
20th-century American male singers
20th-century American singers
University of Missouri alumni
University of Missouri School of Music alumni